The Starting Line is an American pop-punk band based in Philadelphia, Pennsylvania, that formed in 1999.

History

Early years (1999–2001)
In 1999, the band that would become The Starting Line was initiated in Churchville, Pennsylvania via an e-mail from guitarist Matthew "Matt" K. Watts to vocalist/bassist Kenny Vasoli. It asked if the 14-year-old Vasoli, who was at that time in a band called Smash Adams, was interested in "Jamming and shit", as the message title read. Only a few weeks later, Vasoli found himself rehearsing with his future band-mates Watts, guitarist Mike Golla and drummer Tom Gryskewicz. Soon, the band started touring under the name Sunday Drive, selling out home-made merchandise and a self-recorded demo cassette titled Four Songs. Their first official release was a three-way split with The Jimmy Tuesday Band and The Commercials contributing three songs each, released on KickStart Audio in 2000.

Sunday Drive was soon approached by We the People Records and asked to produce a recording session (the We the People Records Sessions). Set for a release in December 2000, the twelve songs were initially planned to become the band's debut full-length on We the People Records, but they ended up serving only as demos for tracks on future releases, as the band signed with Drive-Thru Records in April 2001. On Drive-Thru, they soon released their debut EP With Hopes of Starting Over.... They later found out that the name Sunday Drive was already taken by a Christian rock band, so they changed their band name to The Starting Line. The band has said there is no significance behind the name, it was the only name they all could agree upon.

Say It Like You Mean It (2002–2004)
On July 16, 2002, almost exactly one year after the release of their EP, the full-length Say It Like You Mean It followed. The songs ranged from energetic and fast-paced to melancholy and calm, dealing with performing on stage ("Given the Chance"- "I can't wait to hit the stage/and say hello/To Jersey"), vacation ("Left Coast Envy"- "Vacation's everything we need/Can I sell this sunrise/In return for a sunset?") and getting even with Vasoli's ex-girlfriend Karina ("Up & Go", "Hello Houston", "Cheek to Cheek", among others). The single "Best of Me" and its two music videos, as well as the second single "Leaving", received heavy radio and TV airplay, securing The Starting Line a spot on the Warped Tour. A clip of "Up & Go" was played during an episode of the short-lived television series from Fox, John Doe. The episode aired December 13, 2002, and was entitled 'The Mourner.' "Up & Go" was also included in the full-length trailer for the movie She's The Man, which starred Amanda Bynes.

Due to their desire to put out new material, the band decided to release an all-unplugged EP, recorded in three sessions over the following year. The first three songs ("Make Yourself at Home", "Selective", and "Playing Favorites") (recorded in The Prize Fight's Bob Jones' bedroom in August 2002), the second session ("The Nightlife" and acoustic version of "Best of Me") (recorded in Vasoli's basement in March 2003) and the last track ("Lasting Impressions") (recorded on the band's touring bus in April 2003) became The Make Yourself at Home EP, released on November 25, 2003. The CD and the DVD version issued simultaneously, featuring an acoustic set performed live at Skate & Surf 2003 in Asbury Park, New Jersey, would be their last releases put out solely on Drive-Thru Records, as The Starting Line was signed by Geffen Records soon afterwards.

Based on a True Story and Direction (2005–2007)
Their major label debut, Based on a True Story, came out in May 2005. Lyrically, the band dissociated themselves from the post-relationship formula that was predominant on their previous records. The album is punctuated by several more aggressive songs, written to spite the band's record label. "Inspired by the $" featured lyrics that are directed at Geffen: "Someone/Get to the point/Get it across!/To the boys at the top of the ladder I'm climbing up/I have my doubts". Another section of the song refers to a meeting the band had with the label's executives, where The Starting Line was asked to write more radio-friendly songs in the vein of New Found Glory's Catalyst (2004) and recreate "Best of Me" ("Just stay the same way/Do it like you did it before/Remain the same shape." The album was far more successful than the band's 2002 effort and sold 42,000 copies within its first week, as opposed to its predecessor's 11,000. The release was followed by the semi-headlining Nintendo Fusion Tour with Fall Out Boy, kicking off in September 2005. The band brought with them a new addition to their live performances, keyboardist Brian Schmutz. A friend of Vasoli's, the two had short lived side-project called Statue in 2004. A few dates into the tour, The Starting Line were, at their request, released from their record deal with Geffen. Vasoli describes their time with Geffen: " It was kind of like having a sort of hot girlfriend that never talks to you. You say, "Oh yeah, I 'm dating this supermodel, but she's been in France for three years and doesn't really call me... but she promises that when she gets back we're REALLY gonna start to get serious. It was always an imaginary relationship."

In early January 2006, the band signed with Virgin Records. The band released their third full-length album "Direction" on July 31, 2007, containing the single "Island" which was written about Vasoli's girlfriend of the last four years, Michelle. The album had songs like "What You Want", "21", "Birds" and "Direction". "Island" was the group's lone charting single, peaking at No. 21 on the Billboard Modern Rock charts. The album peaked at No. 30 on the Billboard 200 chart, but fell off the chart four weeks later. The band completed the 2007 Warped Tour and began their nationwide headlining tour the following September.

Hiatus and reunion (2008–present)
In March 2008 the band announced in an e-mail and on Absolutepunk.net they would be going on a break in order for Ken and Brian to explore Person L, Matt and Tom to experiment with the group The Seventy Six, and Mike to spend time with his two daughters and also play with The Traded Series. Matt Watts is currently a band manager for Red Light Management, managing the bands Fake Problems, Like Lions, New Atlantic, and Hit The Lights. The band stated, "They will continue The Starting Line if and when the time is right."

In April 2009, Kenny Vasoli hinted that The Starting Line may actually be returning sooner than 2011, saying "it's looking good, may even be earlier. I hung with Matt and Tom the other day, we all are still in love with one another." On November 10, 2009, The Starting Line released their first Live CD/DVD entitled "Somebody's Gonna Miss Us." The Live CD/DVD documents the band's formation and growth through their last tour and final show at Bamboozle 2008. In December 2009, The Starting Line had a reunion concert at the Theater of Living Arts. The Starting Line guitarist Matt Watts stated on the website AbsolutePunk, that "this doesn't mean that TSL are back together....It simply means that we're taking a break from our break, and wanted to play a fun show in Philadelphia and continue to focus on our lives outside of TSL" (Kohl 1). The Starting Line added a second holiday show in Philadelphia at the Trocadero Theater due to the fact that the first holiday show scheduled for sold out in a little over an hour and the band would like to give their local fans a better chance to see them. Towards the end of their set, Kenny Vasoli announced the band's reunion.

The band played the Australian Soundwave Festival in February 2011. Matt Watts explained that they "didn't want to pass up this opportunity to hang out, have fun, and play with some really great bands," but again stated, "this doesn't mean that TSL are back together, and that we don't plan on doing a US tour any time in the near future." In May 2011, at Slam Dunk Records Leeds music festival, the band played a 50-minute set during which Kenny Vasoli announced "People keep asking us when we're getting back together, and the answer I have is yesterday. And what happens when bands get together? They write music. So, we have a new song for you." The song is entitled 'Luck'.

In late June 2012, the band posted a countdown timer on their website. Upon completion, the website was updated with information about a tour celebrating the 10-year anniversary of their debut album Say It Like You Mean It. The tour would include the band playing the entire album from start to finish. In 2012, frontman Kenny Vasoli formed a side band, Vacationer, which released their debut album, Gone, in June of that same year.

The Starting Line reunited once again for a Christmas show in 2013 at the Starland Ballroom in Sayreville, New Jersey. On July 11, 2014, it was announced on the band's official website that they would be playing another holiday show on December 26, 2014, at the Trocadero in Philadelphia. According to an article on propertyofzack.com, Kenny Vasoli confirmed on stage that the band would be releasing new material in 2015. Said article also features a very low quality video of a new song. On December 14, 2015, the band announced a new EP titled Anyways. The title track was released as the lead single on December 18, 2015. Anyways marked the band's first studio release in 9 years. After years of touring with the band, Schmutz was also confirmed as a full-time member.

Touring
The Starting Line has toured or played shows with bands such as Good Charlotte, Rufio, Senses Fail, Brand New, The Hush Sound, The Early November,  Mest, Saves the Day, The Ataris, Midtown, Sum 41, No Use for a Name, Taking Back Sunday, Yellowcard, New Found Glory, Plain White T's, Fall Out Boy, Paramore, The All-American Rejects, Allister, The Format, RX Bandits, Bayside, Four Year Strong, Steel Train, Dash Eight, The Almost, Motion City Soundtrack, MxPx, Less Than Jake, Reel Big Fish, Panic! at the Disco, Mae, Boys Like Girls, All Time Low, Of All Days, Cartel, Set Your Goals, and has performed at the Vans Warped Tour on four occasions during 2002, 2003, 2005, 2007 and two dates in 2019. The Starting Line has toured throughout four continents including North America, Europe, Asia, and Australia.

On March 1, 2019, the band announced that they were going to celebrate the 20th anniversary as a band by joining the Vans Warped Tour for their 25th anniversary in San Francisco and Atlantic City. They later announced 10 other tour dates in Boston, Los Angeles, Cleveland, Chicago Riot Fest, Denver, Dallas, New York, and their hometown of Philadelphia.

On January 18, 2022, the band announced that they were going to be playing at the When We Were Young Festival in October 2022 in Las Vegas, NV. The festival will feature many well-known bands from the "scene" era including Paramore, My Chemical Romance, The Used, Dashboard Confessional, Avril Lavigne, Jimmy Eat World, Alkaline Trio and many others.

Holiday shows
The band has hosted an annual holiday show for many years. In some years they've hosted multiple shows, with one show in Philadelphia and another in New Jersey or New York City.

Members
 Kenny Vasoli - lead vocals, bass guitar (1999–present)
 Matt Watts – rhythm guitar (1999–present)
 Mike Golla – lead guitar, backing vocals (1999–present)
 Tom Gryskiewicz – drums, percussion (1999–present)
 Brian Schmutz – keyboards, backing vocals (2007–present)

Discography

Studio albums

Extended plays

Live albums

Compilation albums

Singles

Additional tracks

References

External links
http://www.startinglinerock.com

Musical groups established in 1999
Musical groups disestablished in 2008
Musical groups reestablished in 2009
Musical groups disestablished in 2012
Musical groups reestablished in 2015
Musical groups from Philadelphia
Pop punk groups from Pennsylvania
Drive-Thru Records artists
Geffen Records artists
Virgin Records artists
1999 establishments in Pennsylvania
American punk rock groups
Alternative rock groups from Pennsylvania